Vahiny (meaning "traveller" in Malagasy) is an extinct genus of titanosaur sauropod dinosaur known from the Late Cretaceous of the Maevarano Formation, northwestern Madagascar. It contains a single species, Vahiny depereti.

Description 
Vahiny was first described and named by Kristina Curry Rogers and Jeffrey A. Wilson in 2014 and the type species is Vahiny depereti. It is known solely from the Late Cretaceous Maevarano Formation located in northwestern Madagascar, together with the more common titanosaur, Rapetosaurus krausei. Rapetosaurus is the most common dinosaur in its fauna and is known from hundreds of bones, including multiple partial skeletons and skulls, while other taxa are extremely rare, including Vahiny identified from a partial braincase. Vahiny is distinguished from other titanosaurs by characteristics of its braincase, including the basal tubera, basipterygoid processes, parasphenoid, and cranial nerve foramina. Differences in the braincases of Vahiny and Rapetosaurus indicate that they are not closely related to one another. Vahiny is most similar to Jainosaurus from the Late Cretaceous of India, and bears similarities to the South American taxa Muyelensaurus and Pitekunsaurus.

References 

Titanosaurs
Late Cretaceous dinosaurs
Dinosaurs of India and Madagascar
Cretaceous Madagascar
Maastrichtian life
Fossils of Madagascar
Maevarano fauna
Fossil taxa described in 2014
Taxa named by Kristina Curry Rogers